Mariya Ohurtsova (born 4 January 1983 in Zaporizhia) is a Ukrainian former swimmer, who specialized in sprint butterfly events. She represented Ukraine, as a 17-year-old, at the 2000 Summer Olympics, and also trained for the Ukraïna Zaporizhzhia swim team during her sporting career.

Ohurtsova competed only in the women's 100 m butterfly at the 2000 Summer Olympics in Sydney. She achieved a FINA B-cut of 1:02.23 from the Ukrainian National Championships in Kyiv. She challenged seven other swimmers in heat three, including Thailand's three-time Olympian Praphalsai Minpraphal. Coming from fifth at the final turn, Ohurtsova faded down the stretch to pick up a sixth seed in 1:03.00, almost a full second below her entry standard. Ohurtsova failed to advance into the semifinals, as she placed thirty-eighth overall on the first day of prelims.

References

1983 births
Living people
Ukrainian female butterfly swimmers
Olympic swimmers of Ukraine
Swimmers at the 2000 Summer Olympics
Sportspeople from Zaporizhzhia
21st-century Ukrainian women